The Ellis and Eastern Company (reporting mark EE) is a railroad owned and operated by Sweetman Construction Company.

Operating on former Chicago and Northwestern (CNW) trackage, it was formed to ship Sioux Quartzite and other materials such as sand and gravel from a large quarry in Sioux Falls, South Dakota, for Sweetman Construction Company, which uses the railroad primarily to ship materials from the quarry it operates to a concrete plant nearby. Over time, the Ellis and Eastern has shipped more diverse products such as lumber, chemicals, machinery, scrapmetals, and grain to other customers.

Trackage 
The Ellis and Eastern Company operates between Brandon and Ellis, South Dakota on former Chicago and Northwestern trackage. This line was originally constructed by the Chicago, St. Paul, Minneapolis and Omaha Railway (Omaha Road), which stretched from Org, Minnesota, to Mitchell, South Dakota. The portion between Mitchell and Ellis was abandoned in the 1980s, by the Chicago and Northwestern Railroad, the successor of the Chicago, St. Paul, Minneapolis and Omaha Railway. Since the current western terminus of the railroad is at Ellis due to the abandonment of the line westward to Mitchell, the Ellis and Eastern only operates east of that point, hence the name, Ellis and Eastern Company.

Purchase of the Minnesota Southern Railway 
In 2017, the Ellis and Eastern Company announced that it had purchased the Minnesota Southern Railway, which ran from Manley to Worthington, Minnesota. The Minnesota Southern Railway owned a line which was former Chicago and Northwestern trackage, which was a segment of the Chicago, St. Paul, Minneapolis and Omaha Railway which was originally built from Org, MN to Mitchell, SD. It connected Manley to Brandon, which the Ellis and Eastern had attempted to purchase for years for the opportunity to connect with the Union Pacific in Worthington. The Minnesota Southern Railway had declined all attempts by the EE to purchase it, so it sat disputed between the two competitors. That stretch of track had not operated since 1994, and sat dormant until the EE’s acquisition of the MSR’s system. In 2017, the Minnesota Southern Railway officially was purchased by the EE, allowing the EE to assume control of the line to Worthington.The Ellis and Eastern has set out to rehabilitate the stretch between Manley and Brandon to connect with the Union Pacific Railroad in Worthington, Minnesota. The rehabilitation is expected to take up to three years.
The railroad was awarded nearly $14.5 million in a Consolidated Rail Infrastructure and Safety Improvements (CRISI) grant from the U.S. Department of Transportation in March 2020. The grant dollars will be combined with a $19.4 million commitment from Ellis & Eastern to make improvements to the shortline railroad that stretches from Sioux Falls, South Dakota to near the unincorporated community of Org, southwest of Worthington.

See also 
 List of South Dakota Railroads
 D&I Railroad

References 

South Dakota railroads
Minnesota railroads